The Dreisesselberg is a mountain in Bavaria, Germany, in the mountain range Lattengebirge.

Mountains of Bavaria
Berchtesgaden Alps
One-thousanders of Germany
Mountains of the Alps